The Croatian Cycling Federation or HBS is the national governing body of cycle racing in Croatia.

The HBS is a member of the UCI and the UEC.

External links
 

National members of the European Cycling Union
Cycle racing organizations
Cycling
Cycle racing in Croatia